Bandeirenica caboverda, locally known in Cape Verde as "mil-pés" (Portuguese for "thousand-feet"), is a species of millipedes of the family Odontopygidae. It is endemic to Cape Verde, where it occurs in the islands of Santo Antão and São Vicente. First described in 1987 as Spinotarsus caboverdus, it was placed in the genus Bandeirenica in 2000. 

The animal is a pest on Santo Antão, where it damages food crops such as potato, sweet potato, papaya and mango. The Cape Verde government issued a prohibition on the exportation of many of the island's products to the other islands.

References

Further reading 
 Beata Nascimento, Helga Sermann, Carmen Büttner: The influence of environmental conditions on the naturalization of the alien millipede species Spinotarsus caboverdus (Pierrard, 1987) on Cape Verde

Abstracts
 B. Nascimento, H. Sermann, C. Büttner: Biology and the Natural Control of Pest Millipedes Spinotarsus caboverdus (Pierrard, 1987) from Cape Verde (web version) — Tropentag 2002
 B. Nascimento, H. Sermann, C. Büttner: Occurrence of Millipedes by Example of Spinotarsus caboverdus on Cape Verde (web wersion) — Tropentag 2003
 B. Nascimento, H. Sermann, C. Büttner: Possibilities for the Natural Adjustment of the Millipedes Exemplary of Spinotarsus caboverdus (Pierrard) on Cape Verde (web version) — Tropentag 2004

Spirostreptida
Millipedes of Africa
Arthropods of Cape Verde
Fauna of Santo Antão, Cape Verde
Animals described in 1987
Agricultural pest arthropods